Leco, also written as Leko, is a language isolate that, though long reported to be extinct, is spoken by 20–40 individuals in areas east of Lake Titicaca, Bolivia.  The Leco ethnic population was 13,527 in 2012.

Classification
Although Leco is generally considered to be a language isolate, Kaufman (1994: 64) groups Leco together with the Sechura–Catacao languages as part of a proposed Macro-Lecoan family. It has, also, been, suggested that Leco might be grouped with the extinct Puquina languages spoken in the south shore of Lake Titicaca.

Language contact
Jolkesky (2016) notes that there are lexical similarities with the Kulle, Omurano, Taushiro, Urarina, Arawak, Cholon-Hibito, Jaqi, and Quechua language families due to contact.

Background

History
Apart from some brief lists of vocabulary, the main document for which Leco is known is a Christian doctrine compiled by the missionary Andrés Herrero at the beginning of the 19th century.  That doctrine was published in 1905 by Lafone Quevedo, who used it as a source to make a grammatical description of the language.  That work was virtually the only available document about Leco, until the linguist Simon van de Kerke (1994) located some speakers of the language and compiled some additional facts which enlarged the analysis of Quevedo.

Use and description
In Grimes (1988), Leco is classified as a language isolate and is considered extinct.  However, Montaño Aragón (1987) found some speakers of the language in the region of Atén and in Apolo, La Paz, in Franz Tamayo Province in the Bolivian department of La Paz, along Mapiri River  in Larecaja Province (situated also in the department of La Paz).

Some speakers were relocated by van de Kerke (1994–97).  These speakers, mostly men, were older than 50 years and had not habitually used the language since a long time before that.  Van de Kerke relates that the speakers do not feel sufficiently secure to conduct a conversation spontaneously in Leco.

Linguistic description

Phonology
In regard to the phonology of Leco, one can point out the following (based on van de Kerke, 2009: 289–291).

Leco has six vowel phonemes: /a/, /e/, /i/, /o/, /u/ and /è/.  The opposition among the first five vowels is distinguished in the data, but the opposition between /e/ and  /è/ is found only in a limited number of words, as for example pele 'balsa'  and pèlè 'name of plant'.

Lexicon and classes of words
In regard to the lexicon and the classes of words in Leco, one can mention the following (van de Kerke, 2009: 293–297):

In Leco, four major categories of words are distinguished: noun, adjective, verb, and adverb.  Besides, the language has a group of minor categories: names of people, personal pronouns, deictic pronouns, numerals, interrogative pronouns, etc.
Nouns are characterized morphosyntactically by constituting the nucleus of a noun phrase and by allowing inflection of number and case.  Some nouns or substantives in Leco are won 'house' and phose 'daughter'. 
In regard to the pronouns, Leco distinguishes four types: personal pronouns, such as era 'I', iya 'you (singular)', kibi 'he/she'; demonstrative pronouns, such as hoo 'this, near the speaker', on 'that, new the addressee' and hino 'that, far from the speaker and the addressee'; interrogative pronouns, such as ha 'who', u 'what', nora 'where'; and indefinite pronouns, expressed by means of dubitative phrases, composed of an interrogative pronoun and the suffixes -as 'also' and -ka 'como'.
Leco has a large number of adjectival lexemes, which are characterized by expressing qualities of entities.  Thus we have, for example, lais 'bueno', suma 'small'.
Leco has a decimal numeral system, composed of the following units: her 'one', too 'two', chai 'three', dirai 'four', bercha 'five', berphahmo 'six', toiphahmo 'seven', ch'aiphahmo 'eight', beepila 'nine', and beriki 'ten'.  The numbers six to eight follow a system in base five, as in Aymara: 6 = 5 + 1, etc.
Leco has a limited number of adverbial lexemes, as, for example: kumte 'late', ch'eka 'yesterday', china 'very'.  Also, it has a group of postpositions, which express location and which are combined easily with the case markers, such as hekor 'out', apor 'near', haz 'down'.
In regard to the verbs, these are characterized by functioning as the nucleus of the verbal phrase and by receiving inflectional suffixes of time and person, besides having a series of derivational suffixes.  Apart from the auxiliaries neck and kach, Leco has intransitive, transitive, and ditransitive verbs.  A typical characteristic of this language is that of giving much attention to the position of objects.  It manifests itself, for example, in the following verbs, which always combine a noun expressing a position with the auxiliary kach 'to be': chelkach 'to be laid halfway over an object', lewakach 'to be hanging', chakach 'to be sitting', etc.

Morphology
In regard to the morphological characteristics of Leco, one can point out the following (van de Kerke, 2009: 297–313).
Leco is a highly agglutinative language and it uses predominantly suffixes.
In regard to morphology of nouns, nouns have inflection for number, by means of the pluralizing suffix -aya, as in choswai-tha-aya [woman-DIM-PL] 'little women', and inflection for case, as for example the genitive -moki, which is used with alienable entities like kuchi 'perro' in yo-moki kuchi [1SG-GEN] 'mi perro'; the dative -(i)ki, which indicates direction or goal, as in (1); the locative -ra or -te, which marks a locative complement or a directional locative, as in (2); the ablative -rep / -bet, which indicates the locativee origin, as in (3), etc.

Nouns can be combined, furthermore, with a set of derivative suffixes, as, for example, the diminutive -tha, which besides being combined with substantivees, as in won-tha [house-DIM] 'little house', is combined also with adjectives, as is seen in (4).  Another derivative suffix which affects nouns is the 'delimitative' -beka, which expresses the idea of 'no more', 'only', as is seen in (5).  Leco has also deverbative derivative suffixes (which derive nouns from verbs), as, for example, the infinitivizer -sich in (6), which derives an infinitive form which functions as the subject of a sentence; and the agentive -no, which form derived nouns which express an agentive, such as lamas-no [work-AG] 'worker'.

In regard to verbal morphology, verbs have inflection of person, which is formed by means of suffixes which mark the person of the subject and prefixes which mark the object, as is shown in (7).

As is seen in Figure 2, besides inflection for person, the verb in Leco can be combined with a series of inflectional suffixes (which mark, for example, distinctions of aspectual-temporal type).  By way of example, (8) shows the use of the suffix of indirect knowledge (CID) -mono, which is combined with the verb moch 'say' from which it has been derived.

In regard to the category of mood, in Leco one uses suffixes like -kama 'power', -bibi 'almost', among others, to indicate a possible event, as is seen in (9).  Leco has, besides, two forms of imperative of the second person, one directed to only one person and another directed to various persons, as is seen in (10a) and (10b).

Verbs in Leco can be combined, besides, with a set of derivational suffixes, related to aspect, as for example the completive -hi in (11), to distinctions of movement, as, for example, the modifying suffix of movement wari- in (12), and to valence, as for example the reciprocal suffix -mo in (13) and the causative -ki in (14).

In Leco, one sees productive processes of reduplication.  With substantives, reduplication can be interpreted as 'a heap/much of', with adjectives, 'a high degree of'; with verbs the interpretation is very diverse and not always transparent; thus we have the reduplicate verb tiltilkach 'to be undone', derived from tiltil 'undone', which expresses a state or process, for which reason it is combined also with the auxiliary kach 'to be'.

Speech 
In regard to the characteristics of spoken Leco, one can point out the following:
As van de Kerke (2009: 315) points out, the order of the constituents is not fixed, although, in general, the subject takes the first position, especially if it involves a topicalized element.  Besides, the object often precedes the verb, as is seen in (15):

Leco is a pro-drop language; this means that an explicit pronominal subject is not required, although this can appear as in (16) (chera 'we'):

In Leco, one sees simple and compound speech (van de Kerke, 2009: 316–324).  In regard to simple speech, diverse types are distinguished, such as, for example: existential speech, as (17), declarative speech, as (18), interrogative speech, be it confirmative, as (19a), or informative, as (19b), among others.

In regard to compound speech, diverse types are also distinguished: juxtaposed speech, as (20), coordinate speech, as (21), and subordinate speech (causal, concessive, temporal, conditional, consecutive), as (22):

Vocabulary
Loukotka (1968) lists the following basic vocabulary items for Leco.

{| class="wikitable"
! gloss !! Leco
|-
| one || ver
|-
| two || foi
|-
| three || chishai
|-
| head || barua
|-
| eye || bisiri
|-
| hand || bu-eú
|-
| woman || chusna
|-
| water || dua
|-
| sun || heno
|-
| maize || ta
|}

References

External links

Diccionario etnolingüístico y guía bibliográfica de los pueblos indígenas sudamericanos: LEKO Alain Fabre, 2005 
 Lenguas de Bolivia (online edition) Provides information about a number of indigenous languages in Bolivia, such as Leko.
Leco transcriptions of GlobalRecordings audio files

Language isolates of South America
Languages of Bolivia
Endangered language isolates
Mamoré–Guaporé linguistic area